Lodewijk Christiaan van Wachem (born 31 July 1931, Pangkalan Brandan - 24 August 2019, Wassenaar) was a Dutch businessman. Born in the birthplace of Royal Dutch Shell, he was appointed a managing director of Royal Dutch Petroleum in 1977. He was the President of Royal Dutch Shell from 1982 until 1992.

Awards 
1990 Commandeur in de Orde van Orange-Nassau
Ridder in de orde van de Nederlandse Leeuw
1988 Knights of the Order of the British Empire, post Knight Commander of the Most Excellent Order of the British Empire (KBE)
2004 Honorary Citizen of Singapore

References

1931 births
2019 deaths
Dutch business executives
Shell plc people
Delft University of Technology alumni
Dutch Calvinist and Reformed Christians
Chief Executive Officers of Shell plc
People from Langkat Regency
Commanders of the Order of Orange-Nassau
Honorary Knights Commander of the Order of the British Empire
Knights of the Order of the Netherlands Lion
Honorary Citizens of Singapore